The Xiahe mandible is a hominin fossil jaw (mandible) discovered in Baishiya Karst Cave, located on the northeastern edge of the Tibetan Plateau in Xiahe County, Gansu, China. By the use of palaeoproteomic analysis, it is the first confirmed discovery of a Denisovan fossil outside of Denisova Cave, and the most complete confirmed Denisovan fossil. This fossil discovery shows that archaic hominins were present in a high-altitude, low-oxygen environment around 160,000 years ago. Discover, Science News and Nova all named the discovery of the mandible in their lists of Top Science Stories of 2019.

History 

The Xiahe mandible was discovered in 1980 in the Baishiya Karst Cave, located on the northeastern edge of the Tibetan Plateau in Xiahe County, Gansu, China. It was found by a Tibetan Buddhist monk who was meditating in the cave. Dong and his colleague Chen Fahu researched the mandible, but it was so unusual that they did not know how to classify it. As their research focus was geology and not palaeoanthropology, the fossil was overlooked for decades.

In 2010, Chen and his Ph.D. student Zhang Dongju began to study the bone together with Dong and surveyed a number of caves in the Xiahe area. As so much time had passed since its initial discovery, it took them six years to ascertain that the fossil came from Baishiya Karst Cave. As the cave is a Buddhist sanctuary, the excavation was further delayed by the need to obtain permits from the relevant religious and cultural authorities. In 2018, Zhang and her colleagues finally conducted a systematic excavation of the cave and discovered numerous Palaeolithic tools and animal bones bearing cut marks. The Lanzhou University team reached out to Jean-Jacques Hublin at the Max Planck Institute for Evolutionary Anthropology. Hublin and his Ph.D. student Frido Welker joined the research and helped identify the mandible as Denisovan using protein analysis.

Findings 

The Xiahe mandible consists of the right half of a partial mandible with two attached molars. The mandible was covered with a carbonate crust. Uranium-series dating of the carbonate crust places the mandible at over 160,000 years old. It predates Nwya Devu, hitherto the earliest known human presence in a high-altitude, low-oxygen environment, by about 120,000 years.

Researchers failed in their attempts to extract DNA from the fossil. However, they succeeded in identifying surviving ancient proteome in the dentine of one of the molars of the fossil; the Xiahe proteome shares a closest phylogenetic match to that of the high coverage Denisovan fossil from Denisova Cave, Denisova 3. Protein analysis also shows that the Xiahe mandible exhibits a single amino acid polymorphism, COL1α2 R996K, that is only shared by one other specimen on record, Denisova 3; this polymorphism is not found in any other ancient or modern reference population. The mandible also exhibits a single amino acid polymorphism, COL2α1 E583G, that is unique to itself. By way of protein analysis, researchers concluded that the Xiahe specimen belonged to a population that was closely related to the Denisovan specimens from Denisova Cave. This is the first time that an ancient hominin was successfully identified using only protein analysis. It is the most complete known Denisovan fossil. This fossil discovery adds supporting evidence for the notion that archaic hominins were successful in adapting to a high-altitude, low-oxygen environment.

The Xiahe mandible and its teeth exhibit general morphology that is typical of Middle Pleistocene hominin fossils. Researchers describe the mandible as being "very robust". The Xiahe mandible shares one obvious trait, large teeth, that is similar to the Denisovan fossils on record from Denisova Cave. The mandible also shows morphological similarities to some later East Asian fossils such as Penghu 1.

Importance 
Discover, Science News and Nova all named the discovery of the mandible in their lists of Top Science Stories of 2019.

References

Sources 

 
 
 
 
 
 
 

Homo fossils
Lanzhou University
Paleontology in Gansu
Xiahe County
1980 in paleontology
2019 in paleontology
1980 archaeological discoveries